The Iowa–South Dakota League was a minor league baseball circuit that operated  from 1902 to 1903 in the states of Iowa and South Dakota. The league was a Class D level league in both seasons. The Sioux Falls Canaries (1902) and Le Mars Blackbirds (1903) won the league championships.

History
The Iowa–South Dakota League contained six teams in its inaugural season, before being reduced to three in the final season. The Flandreau Indians, Le Mars Blackbirds, Rock Rapids Browns, Sheldon, Sioux City Cornhuskers and Sioux Falls Canaries were the charter members in 1902.

The Sioux Falls Canaries won the championship in 1902, with the Le Mars Blackbirds capturing the 1903 Iowa–South Dakota League final championship.

The 1903 president of the Iowa-South Dakota League was J. U. Sammism, a Le Mars, Iowa attorney.

Cities represented
Council Bluffs, Iowa:  Council Bluffs Bluffers (1903)
Flandreau, South Dakota:  Flandreau Indians (1902)
Le Mars, Iowa:  Le Mars Blackbirds (1902–1903)
Rock Rapids, Iowa:  Rock Rapids Browns (1902)
Sheldon, Iowa:  Sheldon (1902)
Sheldon, Iowa and Primghar, Iowa: Sheldon-Primghar Hyphens (1903)
Sioux City, Iowa:  Sioux City Cornhuskers 1902; Sioux City Soos (1903)
Sioux Falls, South Dakota:  Sioux Falls Canaries (1902–1903)

Standings & statistics 
1902 Iowa-South Dakota League
schedule
 Flandreau joined on June 20, and was awarded a record of (9–9), which made its overall first-half record 31–22.Flandreau won the second half and folded before the playoff against Sioux Falls.

 
1903 Iowa-South Dakota League
 Council Bluffs folded on June 20 with a record of 1–22. On June 25, Council Bluffs transferred to Sheldon–Primghar, which was awarded a record of 14–11.

MLB alumni
Bob Black (Cornhuskers/Sioux)
George Bristow (Blackbirds)
Jim Buchanan (Blackbirds)
Fred Carisch (Canaries)
Bill Carney (Indians)
Homer Hillebrand (Indians)
Pete Lister (Blackbirds)
Bill Moriarty  (Cornhuskers)
Peaches O'Neill (Blackbirds)
Branch Rickey (Blackbirds)
Shag Shaughnessy (Soos)
Dan Stearns (Indians)
Babe Towne (Browns)

References/Sources
Johnson, Lloyd; Wolff, Miles (2007). The Encyclopedia of Minor League Baseball. Baseball America (Third edition). 
Baseball Reference – Iowa-South Dakota League (D) Encyclopedia and History

1902 establishments in South Dakota
1902 establishments in Iowa
1903 disestablishments in Iowa
1903 disestablishments in South Dakota
Baseball leagues in Iowa
Baseball leagues in South Dakota
Defunct minor baseball leagues in the United States
Sports leagues established in 1902
Sports leagues disestablished in 1903